The third season of the Yu Yu Hakusho anime series, known as the Chapter Black Saga, was directed by Noriyuki Abe and produced by Fuji Television, Yomiko Advertising and Studio Pierrot. The episodes were released in North America by Funimation. Like the rest of the series, it adapts Yoshihiro Togashi's Yu Yu Hakusho manga from the thirteenth through seventeenth volumes over twenty-eight episodes. The episodes follow Spirit Detective Yusuke Urameshi and his conflict with a former Spirit Detective, Shinobu Sensui, and the latter's desire to open the gateway to Makai.

The season initially ran from February 5 to August 13, 1994, on Fuji Television in Japan. The first twenty-three English episodes were originally shown from July 2004 to January 2005 on Cartoon Network's Toonami programming block. New episodes began airing in October 2005, with the saga concluding in November 2005.

Three pieces of theme music are used for the episodes: one opening theme and two closing themes.

Seven DVD compilations, each containing four episodes of the saga, have been released by Funimation. The first compilation was released on January 20, 2004, with the seventh released on October 5, 2004. A collection box, containing all seven DVD compilations, was also released by Funimation on October 11, 2005. A Blu-ray compilation was released by Funimation on September 27, 2011.

Episode list

References
General

Specific

External links
Studio Pierrot's YuYu Hakusho website 
Funimation's YuYu Hakusho website

1994 Japanese television seasons
Season 3